St. Clair High School is a high school in St. Clair, Missouri, United States, and is part of the St. Clair R-XIII School District in Franklin County, Missouri. This school is a public high school and services grades 9–12.

Mascot
Saint Clair's mascot is "Spike" the bulldog.  Spike disappeared on January 18th, 2011, and has never resurfaced.

Suicides
Three students, a freshman, a sophomore and a junior committed suicide during a period of seven weeks in 2012.  Bullying was believed by some parents to be the motivation.

References 

High schools in Franklin County, Missouri
Public high schools in Missouri